Kolaba (also spelled Coloba) or Kulaba may refer to the following entities in Central India :

 the former Mahratta princely state Kolaba State
 Kolaba Fort, alias Kulaba Fort or Aliba(u)g Fort
 the former Kulaba District, now Raigad district, in Maharashtra
 the former Kolaba Lok Sabha constituency (Marathi: कुलाबा लोकसभा मतदारसंघ)